Jesús Serrano may refer to:

 Jesús Serrano (sport shooter) (born 1978), Spanish sport shooter 
 Jesus Serrano (volleyball) (born 1994), Mexican volleyball player
 Jesús María Serrano (born 1973), Spanish football midfielder and coach